The 2023 Chhattisgarh Legislative Assembly election is scheduled to be held in or before November 2023 to elect all 90 members of the state's Legislative Assembly. Bhupesh Baghel is the incumbent Chief Minister of the state.

Background 
The tenure of Chhattisgarh Legislative Assembly is scheduled to end on 3 January 2024. The previous assembly elections were held in November 2018. After the election, Indian National Congress formed the state government, with Bhupesh Baghel becoming Chief Minister.

Schedule

Parties and alliances





Others

References

State Assembly elections in Chhattisgarh
Chhattisgarh
2023 State Assembly elections in India